Maggie MacNeal (born Sjoukje Lucie van 't Spijker; 5 May 1950) is a Dutch singer. She was a member of Mouth & MacNeal, a pop duo from the Netherlands, who are best known for their million-selling recording of "How Do You Do" in 1972, which topped the Dutch chart and became a US top ten hit, and for representing the Netherlands at the 1974 Eurovision Song Contest, finishing third with the song "I See a Star", which went on to become a UK top ten hit.

Career
MacNeal had released one solo single – a cover, produced by Hans van Hemert, of "I Heard It Through the Grapevine", written by Norman Whitfield and Barrett Strong and made famous by singer Marvin Gaye – before teaming up with Willem Duyn (Mouth), to form the duo known as Mouth & MacNeal, recording Pop international hits such as "How Do You Do" (1971) and "Hello-A" (1972). She was with Mouth & MacNeal from 1971 to 1974 including a participation in the 1974 Eurovision Song Contest with the song "I See a Star".

After their breakup, she formed her own group in 1975 with her husband Frans Smit (drums), Adri de Hont (guitar), Ben Vermeulen and Wil de Meyer (bass guitar). In 1977, the line-up changed to Smit, Jons Pistoor, Lex Bolderdijk, and Robert Verwey (bass). She participated again in the Eurovision Song Contest 1980 where she finished in 5th place with the song Amsterdam.

MacNeal was one of the artists who recorded the song Shalom from Holland as a token of solidarity to the Israeli people, threatened by missiles from Iraq, during the first Gulf War in 1991. In 2000, she became a member of the Dutch Divas, together with Marga Bult.

Discography

1971
	I Heard It Through the Grapevine/Isolation —Decca Records 6100032
1975
	Nothing else to do/I don't lay my head down —Warner Bros. Records WBN 16581
	When you're gone/Mother nature —Warner Brothers WBN 16632
1976
	Terug naar de kust/Life is going on —Warner Brothers WBN 16738
	Love was in your eyes/Dr. Brian —Warner Brothers WBN 16816
	Make the man love me/The letter —Warner Brothers WBN 16840
	Blackbird/Make the man love me —Warner Brothers WBN 16868
	LP When you're gone —Warner Brothers WBN 56290
1977
	Jij alleen/He never said his name —Warner Brothers WBN 16889
	Fools together/Empty place, empty space —Warner Brothers WBN 17000
	LP Fools together —Warner Brothers WBN 56406
1978
	You and I/It hurts —Warner Brothers WBN 17058
1979
	Ooh/Take it easy —Warner Brothers WBN 17365
	Nighttime/Take it easy —Warner Brothers WBN 17465
	LP Nighttime —Warner Brothers WBN 56738
1980
	Amsterdam/Take it easy —Warner Brothers WEAN 18214
	Amsterdam/Amsterdam [a-side in Dutch, b-side in English] —WEAN 18216
	Amsterdam/Amsterdam [a-side in English, b-side in French] —WEAN 18210 
	Why your lady says goodbye/Sail around the world —Warner Brothers WEAN 18348
	Be my friend/Why your lady says goodbye —Warner Brothers WEAN 18412
	LP Amsterdam —Warner Brothers WEAN 58138
1981
	Be my lover tonight/Together —Warner Brothers WEAN 18774
	LP When you're gone [re] —K-Tel HN 4181
1983
	I've got you, you've got me/Won't you tell me —Carrere 221.020
	Still can't believe it/On the beat (instrumental) —Carrere 221.029 
1985
	You are my hope/Say hello again —DISK 1002 
1989
	Verloren tijd/Heel verliefd —Mercury 876.1067 
	Papa is lief/Heel verliefd —Mercury 876.3847 
1990
	Terug naar de kust/Heel gewoon —Mercury 878-6207 
1997
	Only love/A night in the city —BR Music CDS 6059 
1999
	Old friend/Live in my dreams —CNR 2004219

References

External links
Alexgitlin.com
 

1950 births
Living people
Eurovision Song Contest entrants for the Netherlands
Dutch women singers
Eurovision Song Contest entrants of 1974
Eurovision Song Contest entrants of 1980
Musicians from Tilburg
Nationaal Songfestival contestants